Archibald Gardiner (born 17 March 1913) was a Scottish professional footballer who played as a forward. He made appearances in the English Football League with Leicester City and Wrexham.

References

1913 births
Date of death unknown
Scottish footballers
Association football forwards
English Football League players
Heart of Midlothian F.C. players
Leicester City F.C. players
Wrexham A.F.C. players
Hamilton Academical F.C. players